Valentin Gheorghe (born 14 February 1997) is a Romanian professional footballer who plays as a winger for Süper Lig club Ümraniyespor, on loan from Liga I club FCSB.

A product of Astra Giurgiu, Gheorghe had a loan spell at Afumați before going on to amass over 100 matches in the top flight for his boyhood club. Following Astra's relegation in 2021, he transferred back to the Liga I with FCSB.

Internationally, Gheorghe was capped once for Romania at under-21 level and represented the under-23 team in the 2020 Summer Olympics.

Club career

Early career / Astra Giurgiu
Gheorghe spent his formative years in the academy of Astra Ploiești, which in 2012 relocated its first-team squad to the city of Giurgiu. He made his senior debut with the reserves in the lower leagues, and for the 2015–16 campaign was loaned out to Liga III side Afumați. Upon his return to Astra, he was promoted to the first team and recorded his professional debut at age 19, in a goalless Liga I draw with Pandurii Târgu Jiu on 31 July 2016. 

On 27 October 2016, Gheorghe scored his first Astra goal in a 0–1 victory over NMM Becicherecu Mic in the Cupa României. He made his European debut on 27 July 2017, in a 0–0 draw with Oleksandriya in the third qualifying round of the UEFA Europa League. Gheorghe imposed himself as a regular in the 2018–19 season, totalling six goals from 31 appearances in all competitions. 

The following campaign, Gheorghe netted ten times to become Astra's second-best goalscorer in the league behind Denis Alibec. He was a starter in the 2019 and 2021 Cupa României finals lost 1–2 to Viitorul Constanța and 2–3 to Universitatea Craiova, respectively, with the Ilie Oană Stadium in his native Ploiești hosting both. Gheorghe was named man of the match in the latter game, the last of a season which ended in relegation for Astra.

FCSB
On 3 September 2021, Gheorghe returned to the Liga I by signing a five-year contract with FCSB. Nine days later, he scored on debut in a 6–0 derby thrashing of Dinamo București at the Arena Națională.

Mostly used a second-half substitute, Gheorghe totalled seven goals from 29 appearances in all competitions during his first year in Bucharest.

Loan to Ümraniyespor
Gheorghe agreed to a one-season loan deal with Turkish club Ümraniyespor on 29 June 2022. In the Süper Lig opener against Fenerbahçe on 8 August, he replaced Yonathan Del Valle in the 64th minute and netted a goal for an eventual 3–3 draw.

International career
In June 2021, Gheorghe was selected by manager Mirel Rădoi in Romania's squad for the postponed 2020 Summer Olympics. He started in the opening 1–0 win over Honduras and entered as a substitute in the other two matches of an eventual group-stage exit.

On 3 March 2023, he received his first official call-up to the Romanian senior national team for the UEFA Euro 2024 qualifying matches against Andorra and Belarus.

Career statistics

Club

Honours
Afumați
Liga III: 2015–16

Astra Giurgiu
Cupa României runner-up: 2016–17, 2018–19, 2020–21
Supercupa României: 2016

References

External links

1997 births
Living people
Sportspeople from Ploiești
Romanian footballers
Association football wingers
Liga I players
Liga II players
Liga III players
FC Astra Giurgiu players
CS Afumați players
FC Steaua București players
Süper Lig players
Ümraniyespor footballers
Romania youth international footballers
Olympic footballers of Romania
Footballers at the 2020 Summer Olympics
Romanian expatriate footballers
Expatriate footballers in Turkey
Romanian expatriate sportspeople in Turkey